Italian submarine Beilul was an  built for the Royal Italian Navy (Regia Marina) during the 1930s. It was named after a town of Beilul in Eritrea.

Design and description
The Adua-class submarines were essentially repeats of the preceding . They displaced  surfaced and  submerged.

For surface running, the boats were powered by two  diesel engines, each driving one propeller shaft. When submerged each propeller was driven by a  electric motor. They could reach  on the surface and  underwater.

The boats were armed with six internal  torpedo tubes, four in the bow and two in the stern. They were also armed with one  deck gun for combat on the surface. The light anti-aircraft armament consisted of one or two pairs of   machine guns.

Construction and career
Beilul was launched on 22 May 1938 in OTO's shipyard in La Spezia and commissioned on 14 September 1938.  After an endurance training in the Dodecanese, in December of 1938 Beilul was assigned to Leros. In May of 1940 she was reassigned to 35th Squadron (III Submarine Group) based at Augusta. Her commander at the time was Paolo Vagliasindi.

At the outbreak of hostilities she was immediately sent on a mission to patrol an area between Pantelleria and Lampedusa. She returned to the base on June 19, 1940, without encountering any enemy traffic.

On June 29, 1940 Beilul made a reconnaissance mission near Alexandria surveying British Mediterranean Fleet. In the evening of July 7, 1940 while patrolling in the waters off Crete, in approximate position , Beilul sighted and attacked on the surface from about 1000 yards an enemy destroyer, part of the British Mediterranean Fleet. The submarine then had to withstand a series of depth charge attacks which caused significant damage, forcing her to abort the mission and return to base.

On January 1, 1941 Beilul started her new mission in the Aegean remaining on patrol until January 12. On January 8, 1941, lurking in the waters north of Kasos, she sighted a formation composed of five merchant ships and three escorts. While on the surface, Beilul fired four torpedoes at two ships and immediately disengaged by rapid diving. The outcome of this attack is unknown, since British documentation does not contain any information about sinking or sustained damage at the date and place of the attack.

From February 9 through February 18, 1941 Beilul and  patrolled in the Aegean.

From May 12 through May 20, 1941 she patrolled to the northwest of Alexandria together with Salpa.

During the mission from 25 November to 5 December 1941 Beilul was assigned to patrol an area 25 miles north of Derna. On the evening of December 1, Beilul,  now under command of captain Francesco Pedrotti, was attacked on the surface by a Sunderland flying boat. The crew of the submarine managed to beat back the attack with her anti-aircraft weapons and forced the aircraft to turn away, visibly damaged and on fire. The plane's attack, however, caused some damage to the boat, forcing her to return to the base.

On June 4, 1942, while on patrol off the coast of Cyrenaica, she sighted two small convoys. Beilui launched three torpedoes, but failed to hit the targets. She was detected by the escorts and was subjected to intense and prolonged depth charge attacks. The damage sustained by the submarine forced her to return to the base. On June 6, she docked at Leros. It took several months to repair the damage.

On June 12, 1943, now under command of captain Pasquale Beltrame, Beilul, patrolling off Capo Passero, sighted a formation of three British J-class destroyers. From about 1500 m she launched three torpedoes and disengaged by diving. No hits were reported.

Beilul then was sent to Monfalcone for a long period of repairs and upgrades. On September 3, 1943, Italy signed Armistice of Cassibile surrendering to Allies. On September 9, 1943, Beilul while still under repair and immobilized, was captured by the Germans, who turned it into fuel storage barge. It was sunk in Monfalcone some time in May 1944 as a result of an Allied air attack.

Notes

References
 

Adua-class submarines
World War II submarines of Italy
Lost submarines of Italy
Maritime incidents in May 1944
World War II shipwrecks in the Mediterranean Sea
1938 ships
Ships built by OTO Melara
Ships built in La Spezia
Submarines sunk by aircraft